Drifters (1929) is silent documentary film by John Grierson, his first and only personal film.

It tells the story of Britain's North Sea herring fishery. The film's style has been described as being a "response to avant-garde, Modernist films, adopting formal techniques such as montage – constructive editing emphasising the rhythmic juxtaposition of images – but also aimed to make a socially directed commentary on its subject" (Tate Gallery: Liverpool 2006). The film was successful both critically and commercially and helped kick off Grierson's documentary film movement. This film also showed that Grierson was not afraid to alter reality slightly in order to have his vision shown. For example, when the boat he was on returned without a catch he bought another boats catch and tried to fake it. He ended up scrapping that film as it was not authentic enough.

Release
The film was shown alongside Battleship Potemkin'''s premiere in London.

See also
 Music for Drifters''

References

Works cited

External links

1929 films
British documentary films
Black-and-white documentary films
Films directed by John Grierson
1929 documentary films
Films about fishing
British silent feature films
British black-and-white films
1920s British films
Silent adventure films
1920s English-language films